Victor Manuel Rivera (1916 – December 24, 2005) was a Puerto Rican Episcopalian priest and bishop. He served from 1968 to 1989 as the third bishop of the Episcopal Diocese of San Joaquin.

Education and early career

Rivera was born in Penuelas, Puerto Rico, where his father and four uncles were Episcopal priests.  In 1944, he graduated from the Church Divinity School of the Pacific in Berkeley, California, and was ordained to the priesthood. From 1943 to 1944 he was vicar of Grace Church in Martinez, California, and from 1945 to 1968, he was rector of St. Paul's Episcopal Church, Visalia, California. He also held diocesan offices in the Diocese of San Joaquin.

Episcopacy

In 1968, Rivera was elected third bishop of the Diocese of San Joaquin. He served until his retirement in January 1989, shortly after reaching the mandatory retirement age of 72. He was succeeded by bishop coadjutor John-David Schofield, who had been elected in the fall of 1988.

By the end of Rivera's episcopacy, the Diocese of San Joaquin was one of only six in the Episcopal Church that had not ordained any women to the priesthood. Rivera opposed the ordination of women and sexually active homosexuals during his episcopacy, describing his diocese as "not willing to do away with biblical teachings and the beliefs of the church." When his daughter Nedi was ordained to the Episcopalian priesthood in 1976, Rivera did not attend her ordination service.

Later life

Rivera is reported to have changed his mind on women's ordination after his retirement as bishop, as he participated with approval in the consecration of Nedi Rivera as bishop suffragan in the Episcopal Diocese of Olympia.

Rivera's wife, Barbara, died in April 2005, and he died eight months later on December 23 in Orinda, California.

References

1916 births
People from Peñuelas, Puerto Rico
Puerto Rican Episcopalians
Puerto Rican bishops
American Episcopal priests
2005 deaths
20th-century American Episcopalians
Episcopal bishops of San Joaquin
20th-century American clergy